Daniel St. Pierre is an American film director, art director, production designer, voice actor, animator, and musician. For his work in bringing the Deep Canvas technique to the Disney film Tarzan (1999), he received a 1999 Annie Award nomination for Outstanding Individual Achievement for Production Design in an Animated Feature Production.

Career
St. Pierre has been heavily involved in television and feature animation since 1983, making contributions to He-Man and the Masters of the Universe, Heathcliff & the Catillac Cats, Fat Albert and the Cosby Kids, He-Man and She-Ra, Filmation's Ghostbusters, BraveStarr, and Potsworth & Co.

In 1989 he joined Walt Disney Feature Animation. His first films there included The Little Mermaid, The Prince and the Pauper, Beauty and the Beast, and Aladdin. Later works include The Lion King (1994), The Hunchback of Notre Dame (1996), and Shark Tale (2004) His directorial projects include Everyone's Hero (2006) a film by the late Christopher Reeve that was completed by St. Pierre and Colin Brady, Quantum Quest: A Cassini Space Odyssey (2009), and Legends of Oz: Dorothy's Return (2014).

While working on Tarzan (1999), he and his team at Disney developed a patented process called Deep Canvas that allowed them to animate 3-D backgrounds before animating the characters, thus enhancing the apparent depth of backgrounds.
  For this he received a 1999 Annie Award nomination for "Outstanding Individual Achievement for Production Design in an Animated Feature Production". While with Disney, he also animated a series of Christian themed films for Nest Family Entertainment, including Abraham and Isaac, Moses, and Elijah.

Filmography
Director
Legends of Oz: Dorothy's Return (2014)
Quantum Quest: A Cassini Space Odyssey (2009)
Sheepish (2009)
Everyone's Hero (2006)
Art director
Tarzan (1999)
Layout
One by One (2004)
The Hunchback of Notre Dame (1996)
The Swan Princess (1994)
The Lion King (1994)
Aladdin (1992)
Beauty and the Beast (1991)
The Prince and the Pauper (1990)
The Little Mermaid (1989)
Actor
A Fishified World (2005)
Animator
The Swan Princess: Princess Tomorrow, Pirate Today (2016)
Once Not Far from Home (2006)
Family Plan (2005)
Shark Tale (2004)
All Hands on Deck (2003)
Love Thy Neighbor (2003)
102 Dalmatians (2000)
The King and I (1999)
Elijah (1993)
Moses (1993)
Abraham and Isaac (1992)
The Kingdom of Heaven (1991)
Midnight Patrol: Adventures in the Dream Zone (1990)
Pound Puppies and the Legend of Big Paw (1988)
BraveStarr (1987–1988)
Filmation's Ghostbusters (1986)
She-Ra: Princess of Power (1985–1987)
Jem (1985)
The Secret of the Sword (1985)
He-Man and She-Ra: A Christmas Special  (1985)
Fat Albert and the Cosby Kids (1984)
Heathcliff & the Catillac Cats (1984)
He-Man and the Masters of the Universe (1983–1984)
Miscellaneous Crew
9 (2009)
All Hands on Deck (2004)
Love Thy Neighbor (2003)

Additional sources
Hollywood.com, Daniel St. Pierre filmography
Daniel St. Pierre as director for Everyone's Hero
Star Pulse, Daniel St. Pierre filmography

References

External links

Film.com
TMC News, (December 2, 2008) "Businesses Thrive Amidst a Recession Thanks to Live Help"
Acme Design Company, "Meet our team"

American animated film directors
American animated film producers
American film directors
American film producers
American television producers
Living people
American film studio executives
Walt Disney Animation Studios people
Filmation people
1961 births